Nicolas-Alexandre Dezède (c.1740 in Lyon – 11 September 1798, in Paris) was an 18th-century French composer born from unknown parents.

Dezède presented a great many number of opéras comiques, of which several were popular, at the Théâtre italien de Paris. He served the Duke des Deux-Ponts from 1749 to 1790. A freemason, he was initiated at the lodge Les Neuf Sœurs in Paris. Mozart  and Beethoven both wrote variations on  themes by Dezède.

Main operas 
1772: Julie (28 September) ;
1777: Les Trois Fermiers ;
1783: Blaise et Babet ;
1784: Le Véritable Figaro ;
1785: Alexis et Justine.

References

Bibliography 
Alessandro Di Profio, Dezède (Familie), MGG (Die Musik in Geschichte und Gegenwart), new edition : Kassel, Bärenreiter, 1997, éd. Ludwig Finscher, vol. 5, coll. 961–963

External links 
 
 His opéras-comiques and their presentations on CÉSAR

French opera composers
Male opera composers
1740s births
Musicians from Lyon
1792 deaths
French Freemasons
French male classical composers